Pallo-Iirot (abbreviated P-Iirot) is a football club from Rauma in Finland.  The club was formed in 1930 and their home ground is at the Äijänsuon stadion.  The men's first team currently plays in the Kakkonen.  The Chairman of Pallo-Iirot is Tarmo Salvi.

Background

The club was known as Iirot when it was established in 1930 and it has since taken a number of forms:

 Iirot Rauma until 1968
 Hakrit Rauma from 1969 to 1981 (merger with Lukko Rauma)
 Pallo-Iirot Rauma since 1982

In the 1940s, the club also played bandy for a few years.

At the beginning of the 1990s the leading football clubs in Rauma, namely Rauman Pallo and Pallo-Iirot, merged to form Rauman Pallo-Iirot. A few years later the name reverted to Pallo-Iirot.  The other club based in the town is FC Rauma.

Since 1982 Pallo-Iirot has played 14 seasons in the Ykkönen (First Division), the second tier of Finnish football, in the periods 1984–85, 1991, 1993–2001 and 2004–05.

They also have had six spells in the third tier, the Kakkonen (Second Division), covering 12 seasons from 1983, 1986–87, 1990, 1992, 2002–03 and 2006 to the present day.

The club has approximately 1,000 members comprising both boys and girls and offers the whole family the possibility to engage in football.

Season to season

{|
|valign="top" width=0%|

Junior Section

Pallo-Iirot has the Seal of approval for football which is an acknowledgement for quality of its youth activities in Finland. The club's youth team's programme is based on the active participation of the parents. P-Iirot welcomes the parents together with their children to join the club activities by becoming the youth teams' coaches, and managers or to otherwise support their children's team's activities.

The Nappulaliiga (Little league) offers sports and games, emphasising football, twice a week for the ages of 3 to 11 years. The programme runs from April until September.

Club Structure

Pallo-Iirot currently has 2 men's teams, 1 ladies team, 9 boys teams and 4 girls teams. In the winter the club practices at Äijänsuo indoor hall and on the heated astro-turf.

Current squad

References and sources
 Official Website
Finnish Wikipedia
Suomen Cup
 Pallo-Iirot Facebook

Footnotes

Football clubs in Finland
Rauma, Finland
Association football clubs established in 1930
Bandy clubs established in 1930
1930 establishments in Finland
Defunct bandy clubs in Finland
Sport in Satakunta